Pristava pri Šentjerneju is a settlement in the Municipality of Šentjernej in southeastern Slovenia. The entire municipality is part of the traditional region of Lower Carniola. It is now included in the Southeast Slovenia Statistical Region.

Name
The name of the settlement was changed from Pristava to Pristava pri Šentjerneju in 1953.

References

External links
Pristava pri Šentjerneju on Geopedia

Populated places in the Municipality of Šentjernej